The Bayswater Football Club is an Australian rules football club located in Bayswater, Victoria. They play in Division 1 of the Eastern Football League.

History
The club was founded in 1895, they started in the Box Hull Reporters Association, followed by the Ringwood District FL and the Croydon Ferntree Gully FL.
They were a founding member of the Eastern District Football League in 1962.

References

External links
 Official club site

Eastern Football League (Australia) clubs
Australian rules football clubs established in 1895
1895 establishments in Australia
Sport in the City of Knox